The Honda SH150i is a motor scooter, developed by Honda and presented during 2005. The SH150i is the best selling scooter in Italy.

References

External links
 Honda website

SH150i
Motorcycles introduced in 2005
Motor scooters